Costi may refer to:
Costi Ioniță (born 1978), Romanian musician
Konstantinos "Costis" Stephanopoulos (1926–2016), president of Greece from 1995 to 2005
Cozi Costi, British musician
Giandomenico Costi (born 1969), Italian football player
Memnos Costi (born 1976), British television presenter and footballer
a Romanian village, part of Vânători, Galați commune

See also
Kosti (disambiguation)

Romanian masculine given names